The following is a list of Michigan State Historic Sites in Mecosta County, Michigan. Sites marked with a dagger (†) are also listed on the National Register of Historic Places in Mecosta County, Michigan.


Current listings

See also
 National Register of Historic Places listings in Mecosta County, Michigan

Sources
 Historic Sites Online – Mecosta County. Michigan State Housing Developmental Authority. Accessed January 23, 2011.

References

Mecosta County
State Historic Sites
Tourist attractions in Mecosta County, Michigan